Selo is a settlement in the Municipality of Sežana in the Littoral region of Slovenia.

References

External links

Selo on Geopedia

Populated places in the Municipality of Sežana